União Recreativa e Desportiva de Tires is a Portuguese football club located in Tires, Portugal.

Colours and badge 
Tires' colours are green and white.

External links 
 Official website
 Soccerway Profile
 Fora de Jogo Profile

Football clubs in Portugal
Association football clubs established in 1962
1962 establishments in Portugal